Bela Imre (27 January 1920 – 5 July 2001) was a Romanian alpine skier. He competed in the men's slalom at the 1948 Winter Olympics.

References

External links
 

1920 births
2001 deaths
Romanian male alpine skiers
Olympic alpine skiers of Romania
Alpine skiers at the 1948 Winter Olympics
Sportspeople from Brașov